Brightview could refer to:

 Brightview, Alberta, a locality in Canada
 Brightview Group, former United Kingdom Internet Service Provider group
 BrightView LCD Screen, glossy display laptop screen by HP/Compaq
 Brightview, Queensland, a locality in Australia